Thomas Charles Bresh (February 23, 1948 – May 23, 2022), sometimes spelled Tom Bresh, was an American country music guitarist and singer. Active from the 1970s, Bresh charted multiple singles on the Billboard Hot Country Songs charts.

Biography
Bresh was born on February 23, 1948, in Hollywood, California, as the son of country singer Merle Travis. As a child, Bresh began acting in films and recording his own music. He also worked as a movie stuntman at the Corriganville Movie Ranch.

In 1963, he was a member of the rock and roll band The Crescents featuring Chiyo when they recorded an instrumental track, "Pink Dominos". Producer Kim Foley issued this as a 45RPM single with "Breakout" on the B-side. "Pink Dominos" peaked at No. 69 on the Billboard Hot 100 in early 1964.

He then released a solo single about D. B. Cooper which was withdrawn due to controversy over its subject matter.

Starting in 1972, Bresh recorded for Kapp Records. His first charted single, "Home Made Love", made number six on the Hot Country Songs charts in 1976. This was included on an album of the same name for Farr Records. Due to the song's success, Bresh was nominated by the Academy of Country Music as Top New Male Vocalist that year.

Bresh recorded two albums for ABC Records as well: Kicked Back in 1977 and Portrait a year later, both produced by Jimmy Bowen. Cash Box magazine reviewed Kicked Back favorably, saying that Bresh had "[a] perfectly mellow voice and vital tracks with excellent material and interpretation".  Record World magazine published a positive review of Portrait, calling the album "versatile" and noting the variety of musical influences. Included on Portrait was a cover of "Smoke! Smoke! Smoke! (That Cigarette)" which featured Bresh performing thirteen different impersonations.

Bresh hosted a weekly television variety show of his own creation, Nashville Swing, was a regular on The Merv Griffin Show and Dinah!, and made a guest appearance on the TNN special A Salute to the Country Greats.  As a producer, he has been employed by country legend Jerry Reed, classical guitarist Valerie DuChateau, and Merle Travis. As a videographer, Bresh has shot, produced, and edited projects for Hank Thompson, Lyle Lovett, Brooks & Dunn, George Jones, Tanya Tucker and Jerry Reed.

Bresh was diagnosed with esophageal cancer in 2021. He died in Nashville on May 23, 2022, at the age of 74.

Discography

Albums

Singles

References

External links
 Official website
 Pat Bovenizer Interview - NAMM Oral History Library (2016)
 
 

1948 births
2022 deaths
20th-century American guitarists
20th-century American male musicians
ABC Records artists
American country guitarists
American country singer-songwriters
American male guitarists
American male singer-songwriters
Country musicians from California
Guitarists from California
Singer-songwriters from California
People from Hollywood, Los Angeles
Deaths from esophageal cancer